The Mount Taiwu is a mountain in Jinhu Township, Kinmen County, Taiwan. It is the highest peak in Kinmen.

History
The trails on the mountain used to be the walking path for traders carrying foods in the old days, such as tofu and vegetables, thus the trail was named Tofu Ancient Trail. Starting 2017, the Kinmen County Government started to promote the hiking trail for tourism.

Geology
It features several hiking trails with granite steps which leads up to the mountain peak, such as the Tofu Ancient Trail and Caicuo Ancient Trail.

Tourist attractions
 Wu-Wang-Zai-Ju Inscribed Rock

See also
 List of tourist attractions in Taiwan
 List of mountains in Taiwan

References

Landforms of Kinmen County
Taiwu